
Gmina Wołczyn is an urban-rural gmina (administrative district) in Kluczbork County, Opole Voivodeship, in south-western Poland.

The gmina contains part of the protected area called Stobrawa Landscape Park.

Villages
Apart from the town of Wołczyn, Gmina Wołczyn contains the villages and settlements of Bruny, Brynica, Brzezinki, Duczów Mały, Duczów Wielki, Gierałcice, Komorzno, Krzywiczyny, Ligota Wołczyńska, Markotów Duży, Markotów Mały, Rożnów, Skałągi, Świniary Małe, Świniary Wielkie, Szklarnia Szymonkowska, Szum, Szymonków, Wąsice, Wierzbica Dolna, Wierzbica Górna and Wierzchy.

Neighbouring gminas
Gmina Wołczyn is bordered by the gminas of Byczyna, Domaszowice, Kluczbork, Murów, Pokój, Rychtal and Trzcinica.

Twin towns – sister cities

Gmina Wołczyn is twinned with:
 Haßloch, Germany
 Kerekegyháza, Hungary

References

Wolczyn
Kluczbork County